

D

Da

De

Di

Do

Du

E

F

Fa

Fe

Fi

Fo

G

Ga

Ge

Go

References

External links
Schlumberger Oilfield Glossary

Underwater diving terminology
Underwater diving
Wikipedia glossaries using description lists